Roshchin is a surname. Notable people with the surname include:

Anatoly Roshchin (1932–2016), Russian wrestler
Artyom Roshchin (born 1993), Russian football player 
Mikhail Roshchin (1933–2010), Russian playwright, screenwriter and short story writer

See also
Roshchino